"Nothing Left to Lose" is a song by American artist Mat Kearney. It was released in May 2006 as the lead single from major-label debut of the same name. The song charted number 21 on the Billboard Hot Adult Contemporary Tracks and peaked on the Billboard Hot 100 at number 41. The single was certified gold on November 6, 2007.

Charts

Weekly charts

Year-end charts

Certifications

Awards 
In 2007, the song was nominated for a Dove Award for Song of the Year at the 38th GMA Dove Awards.

References 

2006 singles
2006 songs
Columbia Records singles